Married to the Kellys is an American sitcom that aired on ABC from October 3, 2003 to April 23, 2004 with a run of 22 episodes. Set in a Kansas suburb of Kansas City, Missouri, the series stars Breckin Meyer and Kiele Sanchez. The show was a part of the TGIF Friday night line up, after Hope & Faith, airing at 9:30 EST. The show earned fair enough ratings to get picked up for a whole season, but it was cancelled at the end of the season.

The series followed the adventures of a single-child New Yorker adjusting to life with his wife's large, close-knit suburban family.

The show was originally to be titled Back to Kansas.

Premise
Producer Tom Hertz (Spin City, Less Than Perfect) loosely based this comedy on his life experiences. The sitcom centers on New York loner Tom (Breckin Meyer, Clueless) who was raised as an only child. After he marries Susan (Kiele Sanchez, That Was Then), a woman raised in the Midwest by a large family, they move to Kansas to be closer to them and he has to quickly adjust to life with a big, caring family.

When Tom married Susan he thought he was only getting a new wife. He never even considered that he would be getting a brand-new family as well. Included in this new family are mother Sandy, the rule-maker of the house, and father Bill, once an only child, who could be the person Tom can relate to the most. There's also Susan's competitive sister Mary and her husband Chris, who considers himself Bill and Sandy's favorite son-in-law and finds Tom as somewhat of a threat. And finally there's Susan's brother Lewis, a shy and awkward young man who has made a career of collecting bugs. Other family members who occasionally drop by include Uncle Dave, the big-shot of the family, and Lisa, the youngest daughter who wants to backpack around Europe and become an art major.

When Married to the Kellys premiered Fridays at 8:30pm/7:30 central during ABC's fall 2003 season, it aired after George Lopez, where ABC brought back its famed TGIF block along with the new Kelly Ripa comedy Hope & Faith and Life with Bonnie. Originally bought by ABC as The Untitled Tom Hertz Project the show needed a quick title in order for the series to be promoted in time for the network to unveil its new line-up. So they decided on the tentative title Back to Kansas. Although the series does take place in Kansas the title didn't quite work since the main character isn't really returning to Kansas (his wife is) and the show wasn't really about the wife's "return" to Kansas but more about the entire Kelly family and the main character's efforts in trying to fit into a new situation. The show soon acquired the more appropriate and fitting title Married to the Kellys. An interesting fact about the show is that Tom Hertz didn't just use real life situations as inspiration for this sitcom, he also used real life family members. All the characters in the series were named after Tom, his wife and his in-laws (with the exception of Lewis).

Married to the Kellys also starred Josh Braaten (That '80s Show), Nancy Lenehan (Grace Under Fire), Emily Rutherfurd (The Ellen Show, Van Wilder), Sam Anderson (Angel) and newcomer Derek Waters.

Cast
 Breckin Meyer as Tom Wagner
 Kiele Sanchez as Susan Wagner
 Josh Braaten as Chris
 Emily Rutherfurd as Mary
 Derek Waters as Lewis Kelly
 Sam Anderson as Bill Kelly
 Nancy Lenehan as Sandy Kelly
 Richard Riehle as Uncle Dave

Guest stars
 Ashley Johnson as Shari
 Eddie McClintock as Bob
 Seth Green as Dr. Jim Coglan
 Stephen Tobolowsky as Henry Conway
 Tinsley Grimes as Lisa Kelly
 Lee Majors as himself
 Tony Gonzalez as himself
 Michele Lee as Maggie Wagner
 Tony Roberts as Martin Wagner
 Keith Coogan as Customer

Characters

Tom & Susan
Tom is a quirky, sometimes-stupid only child from New York who marries Kansas-raised Susan Kelly and decides to move back to her home so they can be closer to her parents. Tom is a writer with a New York Times best-selling novel under his belt and Susan is a homemaker.

Chris & Mary
Chris is the whipped and sappy son-in-law who married Mary Kelly (who kept her last name Kelly while she was teaching at a university) and who fixes all of the problems around the house. Tom is usually trying to get Chris to stop being so uptight. Mary on the other hand is trying to get Chris to be like a dog to his master and ends up winning anyway.

Lewis
Lewis is Mary and Susan's younger brother. He has a strange obsession with bugs and a secret girlfriend named Shari.

Bill & Sandy
Bill and Sandy Kelly are the average all-American parents. Bill works a normal job and Sandy stays home and takes care of the home. The two are usually seen smiling and joking, saying words that haven't been included in the dictionary since the 1950s.

Episodes

External links
 

2000s American sitcoms
2003 American television series debuts
2004 American television series endings
American Broadcasting Company original programming
English-language television shows
Television series about families
Television series by 20th Century Fox Television
Television shows set in Kansas
TGIF (TV programming block)